Bhakkar railway station is located in Bhakkar, Pakistan.

See also
 List of railway stations in Pakistan
 Pakistan Railways

Trains Stops

References

External links

Railway stations in Bhakkar District
Railway stations on Kotri–Attock Railway Line (ML 2)